Dark Eyes is the debut studio album by the Canadian indie rock band Half Moon Run, released through Indica Records in Canada on March 27, 2012. Their debut single "Full Circle" reached number 29 on the Canadian rock/alternative chart in 2012. The track was also used on the 'Horizon' trailer for Assassin's Creed IV: Black Flag, shown during E3 2013. The album's second single "Call Me in the Afternoon" peaked at number 19 on the Canadian rock/alternative chart in 2013. In the United States, the album has sold 12,000 copies as of September 2015. The band also released a song entitled 'Unofferable' on the album's international release in July 2013.

Track listing

Charts

Personnel

Half Moon Run
Devon Portielje
Conner Molander
Dylan Phillips

Additional musicians
Thomas Chartré – cello on "Need It", "Give Up", and "21 Gun Salute"
Brigitte Dajczer – violin on "Give Up"
Tosca String Quartet – strings on "Unofferable"
Babette Hayward – background vocals on "21 Gun Salute"

Production
Daniel Lagacé – producer, engineer
Nygel Asselin — engineer, producer
Shawn Cole — engineer on "She Wants to Know"
Jim Eno — producer and engineer on "Unofferable"
Devon Portielje — engineer on "21 Gun Salute"
Sean McLean Carrie — assistant engineer
Scott Ord — assistant engineer
Layne Frank — assistant engineer
James Peter Watkins — assistant engineer
Chris Russell — assistant engineer
Chris Shaw — mixing
Ruadhri Cushnan — mixing on "Full Circle" and "Unofferable"
Ryan Morey — mastering
Matthew Joycey — photography, concept, and art direction
Yannick Turenne — props
Peter Edwards — layout

References

2012 debut albums
Half Moon Run albums
Indica Records albums